is a Japanese fencer. He competed in the individual foil event at the 1992 Summer Olympics.

References

External links
 

1969 births
Living people
Japanese male foil fencers
Olympic fencers of Japan
Fencers at the 1992 Summer Olympics
Sportspeople from Akita Prefecture